WJFD-FM (97.3 MHz) is a commercial radio station licensed to New Bedford, Massachusetts.  The station is owned by Henry M. Arruda with the license held by WJFD-FM, Inc.  Studio and offices are on Orchard Street in New Bedford.  The transmitter is located off Arcene Street in Fairhaven.  WJFD-FM airs a Portuguese language music format.  It is aimed at the Portuguese, Brazilian and Cape Verdean communities in Southeastern New England.

History
On February 22, 1949, the station signed on as WBSM-FM.  It was the FM counterpart to AM 1230 WBSM (now on AM 1420).  WBSM-AM-FM were owned by the Bay State Broadcasting Company.  At first, WBSM-FM simulcast its AM sister station, but with a large Portuguese-speaking population in the region, many of whom came to Coastal New England to work in the fishing industry, management decided to devote WBSM-FM to Portuguese programming.

In 1972, the call letters switched to WGCY.  It was owned by Gray Communications, and continued its Portuguese pop music and talk.  In 1975, local prosecutor and political leader Edmund Dinis, born in the Azores and of Portuguese descent, acquired the station.

The station was assigned the WJFD-FM call sign by the Federal Communications Commission on December 1, 1980.  Edmund Dinis wanted to honor his father by using his initials in the new call sign, Jacinto F. Diniz.  (The father used a Z at the end of the family name, while Edmund used an S.)

Edmund Dinis owned the station until his death on March 14, 2010, at age 85. On August 2, 2010, ownership of the station was transferred to Dinis' close friend and business partner, Henry M. Arruda.  The station moved its studios and offices from an historical downtown location on Union Street, to the third floor of the Howland Place professional building in the south end of New Bedford shortly after.

In 2015, WJFD-FM joined the iHeartRadio platform of streaming radio stations, becoming the first and only Portuguese language radio station in the U.S. to be offered.  Over time, immigration from Portugal has dropped off, so many of WJFD-FM's newer listeners are of Portuguese-Brazilian-Cape Verdean-descent and non-Portuguese listeners. Beginning in 2018, they have also provided a live broadcast of the Eurovision Song Contest final, with commentary in English and Portuguese.

References

External links
WJFD-FM official website

JFD-FM
Portuguese-American culture in Massachusetts
Portuguese-language radio stations in the United States
New Bedford, Massachusetts
Mass media in Bristol County, Massachusetts
Radio stations established in 1949
JFD-FM
1949 establishments in Massachusetts